Longford Town Football Club is an Irish football club playing in the League of Ireland First Division. The club, founded in 1924 and elected to the league in 1984, is based in Longford, County Longford and play their home matches at Strokestown Road, which for sponsorship reasons is also known as Bishopsgate. Club colours are red and black, and the club goes by the nickname 'De Town'.

History
Longford Town Football Club was founded in 1924 at a meeting held in the Temperance Hall. At the meeting, it was decided that the club colours were to be those of the famous Dublin club, Bohemians, ‘Red and Black’. Present at the meeting were Michael (Ikey) Farrell, Paddy Farrell, Michael Hanley, Tom Malone, Johnny Foley, Willie Jarrett, Tom Kelly, Tom Colbert and Jim Mulligan.

The Town had £24 in the kitty to start off and their first big success was winning the Leinster Junior Cup in the 1930–31 season when they beat St. Malachy's of Dundalk at Longford Park. After the game, the Foresters Brass and Reed Band and Longford Pipe and Drum Band led the victory parade through the streets of the town. The Longford team included Tom O’Beirne, Packy Shine, Mel Deane, Jimmy Malynn, John Dennigan, Jimmy and Billy Clarke, Freddy Dykes and Jimmy Breslin. In the 1935–36 season, the Town were promoted to Division 1 of the Leinster Senior League. The following season saw the Town clinch the FAI Intermediate Cup which was a considerable achievement coming so soon after promotion from the Junior ranks. Further Intermediate Cup successes, as well as Metropolitan Cup wins, followed in the 1950s and 1960s.

Longford Town reached the final of the Leinster Senior Cup in 1954, when they lost 2–1 to Shamrock Rovers, on St. Stephen's Day. The Hoops, then at their peak, got the winning goal with less than three minutes to go. Longford's team on the day was: Peter Keogh, Seamus Devlin, Sonny Canning, Billy Murphy, Paddy Kinsella, Johnny Peelo, Paschal Quinn, Andy Reville, Paddy Gilbert, Gerry Malone and Joe O’Brien.

Many Longford-born players received International or inter-league honours over the years. Mel Deane was the first, when he was capped against Scotland in a Junior International. Then followed Junior International honours versus England for Jimmy and Paddy Clarke, as well as Youth International caps for Ignatius Branigan (against Holland) and Teffia Park's Mark Devlin.

The club was 60 years in existence before its election to the League of Ireland in 1984. In their first season in the league they finished last in the Premier Division and were one of the four sides to be relegated to the newly created First Division for the following season. In their second season they finished bottom of the First Division with only 7 points.  Town finished in the bottom six of the ten-team First Division in each of the next eleven seasons.

The appointment of the then 26-year-old rookie manager Stephen Kenny in the summer of 1998 proved the catalyst for a major upturn in the club's fortunes on the pitch. In the 1998/99 season, they missed out a place in the promotion/relegation play-off by just four points.  The following season saw further improvement when the Town finished in second place and, as a result, won promotion to the Premier Division. This was secured on the final day of the season, 22 April 2000, with a 2–0 victory away to Cobh Ramblers. The starting XI was: Stephen O'Brien, Enda Kenny, Wes Byrne (captain), Paul McNally, Stephen Kelly, Paul Perth, Vinny Perth, Stephen Gavin, Shay Zellor, Keith O'Connor and Richie Parsons. Early goals from O'Connor (the 1999/2000 First Division top scorer) and Byrne proved the difference.

Longford performed admirably in their first season back in the Premier Division finishing in mid-table.  That season also saw the club reach the FAI Cup Final for the first time, where they lost 1–0 to Bohemians. As Bohs had also won the League title that season, De Town qualified to play in the UEFA Cup in July 2001. A meeting over two games with Bulgarian club side PFC Litex Lovech ended in a 3–1 aggregate victory for the Bulgarians.

Things were less comfortable in the league during the 2001/02 season after that, as they ended up in the relegation/promotion play-off, where they played Finn Harps in a two-legged affair.  Longford won in a penalty shootout after the tie ended 3–3 on aggregate.  After the 2002/03 season, the club became an established top division side, led by manager Alan Mathews, with four successive top-six finishes.

On 26 October 2003, the Town clinched their first title in senior football when winning the FAI Cup following a 2–0 victory over St. Patrick's Athletic at Lansdowne Road. The starting XI was: Stephen O'Brien, Alan Murphy, Barry Ferguson (captain), Brian McGovern, Seán Dillon, Alan Kirby, Vinny Perth, Philip Keogh, Sean Prunty, Shane Barrett and Sean Francis. Barrett and Francis found the net and victory more than made up for the disappointment of having lost the League Cup final, against the same opposition, two months previously.

2004 would prove to be the most successful year in the club's history. The Town produced a cup double by first winning the League Cup with a 2–1 victory over Bohemians, in a final held in Longford, with the crucial second goal scored by local player Seán Prunty.  The FAI Cup was retained following a dramatic 2–1 win over Waterford United at Lansdowne Road on 24 October 2004. Trailing with five minutes to go, late goals by Waterford-born Alan Kirby and sub Paul Keegan sent the 6,000 Longford fans present into a frenzy. The starting XI was: Stephen O'Brien (captain), Alan Murphy, Graham Gartland, Seán Dillon, Sean Prunty, Dean Fitzgerald, John Martin, Alan Kirby, Shane Barrett, Dessie Baker and Eric Lavine.

The FAI Cup successes saw the club enter the UEFA Cup in both 2004 and 2005.  On both occasions, however, they lost in the first qualifying round on aggregate.

The 2007 season was a disappointing one for the midlands club as, along with losing the FAI Cup Final to Cork City, the team were relegated after finishing bottom of the Premier Division. That does not tell the whole story however, as De Town were deducted six league points during the season for failing to comply with club licensing procedures. These six points proved crucial in the end as, without this deduction, they would have finished safe from relegation and the relegation play-off.

This cost the club dearly, as there followed six frustrating years in the First Division, before being promoted as Champions at the end of the 2014 season. The title was clinched, under the management of Tony Cousins, following a resounding 5–0 victory at home to Shamrock Rovers B on 3 October 2014. This league title triumph was the club's first-ever in senior football with the trophy presented to club captain Mark Salmon. The goals of David O'Sullivan and Gary Shaw, along with the contribution of the experienced quartet of Pat Sullivan, Pat Flynn, Stephen Rice and Kevin O'Connor, were pivotal in the season's success.

In their first season back in the Premier Division, de Town finished off the 2015 season in a creditable 6th position. The 2016 league season was very disappointing with Longford finishing bottom and relegated back to the First Division.

The 2020 League of Ireland First Division season was suspended after a few weeks due to the COVID-19 pandemic.  De Town had played, and won, their two opening league matches before the suspension in March. It wasn't until 31 July, after a break of almost five months, that matches resumed.  Finishing the league season in fourth place saw the side enter the promotion play-off series. Victories over UCD and Galway United set up a final appearance against Shelbourne on 15 November 2020. A Rob Manley goal earned a 1–0 win for the Town to secure promotion back to the Premier Division for 2021. The 2021 season would prove a difficult one with the side bottom of the table for most of the year and relegated with six matches remaining. Despite plenty of spirited performances and no lack of effort, a 25-game winless streak from March to September consigned them to an immediate return to the First Division.

European record
Last update: July 2005

Overview

Matches

Current squad

 (on loan from Bohemians)

 (on loan from Shelbourne)

Technical staff

2023 Fixtures / Results 
SSE Airtricity League First Division

FAI Cup

Longford Town score first in all cases

2023 Goalscorers 

FD = First Division, FC = FAI Cup

Mohamed Boudiaf

Honours
FAI Cup: 2
2003, 2004
League of Ireland Cup: 1
2004
League of Ireland First Division: 1
2014
FAI Intermediate Cup: 5
1936–37, 1954–55, 1959–60, 1961–62, 1968–69
Connacht Junior Cup 1
1931–32
Enda McGuill Cup: 1
 2002–03

Records
 League victory: 7–1 v Athlone Town, 19 August 2017 and 6–0 v Shamrock Rovers B, 30 May 2014
 League defeat: 1–8 v Waterford United, 12 November 1989
 Points in a season: 70, 1999–2000 (36 games)
 League goals in a season (player): 24, David O'Sullivan, 2013  
 League goals: 69, David O'Sullivan, 2013–2017  
 League appearances: 250, Stephen O'Brien, 1998–2005

Notes
 Including 2 goals in play-offs

Former Managers (League of Ireland era)
  Charlie Walker (1984–1985)
  Billy Bagster (1985–1987)
  Pat 'Zac' Hackett (1987–1990)
  Ron Langford (1990)
  Pat 'Zac' Hackett (1990–1991)
  Con Flanagan (1991–1992)
  Dermot Keely (1992–1993)
  Liam Brien (1994)
  John Cleary (1994–1996)
  Michael O'Connor (1996–1998)
  Stephen Kenny (1998–2001)
  Martin Lawlor (2001–2002)
  Alan Mathews (2002–2007)
  Aaron Callaghan (2007–2008)
  Alan Gough (2008–2009)
  Gareth Cronin (2009)
  Tony Cousins (2009–2016)
  Alan Mathews (2016–2017)
  Neale Fenn (2017–2019)
  Daire Doyle (2019–2021)
  Gary Cronin (2021–2022)

Supporters Player of the Year

References

External links

Official club website

 
Association football clubs in Leinster
Association football clubs established in 1924
League of Ireland First Division clubs
Sport in Longford (town)
1924 establishments in Ireland
Former League of Ireland Premier Division clubs
Former Leinster Senior League clubs
League of Ireland B Division clubs
Connacht Senior League (association football) clubs
Sports clubs in County Longford